The 1981 Seiko Classic was a women's professional tennis tournament played on clay courts at the Victoria Park Stadium in Hong Kong  and was part of the Toyota Series of the 1981 WTA Tour. It was the second edition of the event and took place from 2 November until 8 November 1981. First-seeded Wendy Turnbull won her second consecutive singles title at the event and earned $8,500 first-prize money.

Finals

Singles
  Wendy Turnbull defeated  Sabina Simmonds 6–3, 6–4

Doubles
  Ann Kiyomura /  Sharon Walsh defeated  Anne Hobbs /  Susan Leo, 6–3, 6–4

References

External links
 ITF tournament edition details

Hong Kong Open (tennis)
Hong Kong Open (tennis)
1981 in Hong Kong sport